The 10th Wisconsin Infantry Regiment was an infantry regiment that served in the Union Army in the western theater of the American Civil War.

Service
The 10th Wisconsin was raised at Milwaukee, Wisconsin, and mustered into Federal service October 14, 1861. The regiment was mustered out on October 25, 1864, and the re-enlisted veterans and later recruits transferred to the 21st Wisconsin Volunteer Infantry Regiment.

Commanders
 Colonel Alfred R. Chapin (October 14, 1861January 1863) resigned.
 Colonel John G. McMynn (January 1863June 16, 1863) resigned.
 Lt. Col. John H. Ely (June 16, 1863September 20, 1863) was mortally wounded at the Battle of Chickamauga.
 Lt. Col. Jacob W. Roby (September 20, 1863October 25, 1864) mustered out.

Total enlistments and casualties
The 10th Wisconsin initially mustered 1,029 men and later recruited an additional 601 men, for a total of 1,630 men.
The regiment lost 5 officers and 91 enlisted men killed in action or who later died of their wounds, plus another 1 officer and 147 enlisted men who died of disease, for a total of 244 fatalities.

Notable people
 John A. Barney was enlisted in Co. B and promoted to 1st sergeant.  He was lost an arm and was captured at Chickamauga, and was then discharged due to disability.  After the war he served as a Wisconsin state senator.
 Joshua James Guppey was the original lieutenant colonel of the regiment and was commissioned colonel of the 23rd Wisconsin Infantry Regiment in July 1862.  After the war he received an honorary brevet to brigadier general and served as a Wisconsin county judge.
 Sophronius S. Landt was enlisted in Co. D and promoted to sergeant.  After the war he served as a Wisconsin state legislator.
 Robert Mitchell was 1st assistant surgeon of the regiment and later commissioned surgeon of the 27th Wisconsin Infantry Regiment.  After the war he served as a Wisconsin state legislator.

See also

 List of Wisconsin Civil War units
 Wisconsin in the American Civil War

References
The Civil War Archive

Military units and formations established in 1861
Military units and formations disestablished in 1864
Units and formations of the Union Army from Wisconsin
1861 establishments in Wisconsin